The United States competed at the 2022 World Athletics Championships in Eugene, Oregon, from 15–24 July 2022.  The selection meet for these championships was the 2022 USA Outdoor Track and Field Championships. Team members were announced on July 5.

The United States won the first ever title of "World Team Champions", a trophy inaugurated during this championships.

Medalists

* – Indicates the athlete competed in preliminaries but not the final

Results

Men 

 Track and road events

* – Indicates the athlete competed in preliminaries but not the final

 Field events

 Combined events – Decathlon

Women 

 Track and road events

* – Indicates the athlete competed in preliminaries but not the final

 Field events

 Combined events – Heptathlon

Mixed

References 

Nations at the 2022 World Athletics Championships
World Championships in Athletics
2022